Nicholas K. Lindheim (born November 9, 1984) is an American professional golfer who currently plays on the PGA Tour.

Professional career
Lindheim turned professional in 2005 and played on several U.S. mini-tours during his early career including the Florida Professional Golf Tour. His first win on this tour came at the 2010 event at Pelican Bay. Subsequently, he won a further five events on the tour.

In 2014, Lindheim joined the Web.com Tour and PGA Tour Latinoamérica. During his season on the Web.com Tour, he achieved two top-10 finishes. In 2014, Lindheim qualified for his first major championship by shooting 7-under-par in sectional qualifying for the 2014 U.S. Open. He went on to make the cut and finished in a tie for 56th. In October 2014, Lindheim achieved his first win in an Official World Golf Ranking points event by winning the Arturo Calle Colombian Classic on PGA Tour Latinoamérica. He finished 51st on the 2015 regular season money list and 39th on the Finals list, not enough to qualify for a PGA Tour card. In 2016, he earned his first win on the Web.com Tour at the Utah Championship. This win helped him finish in the top 25 in the regular season to earn his PGA Tour card for the 2016–17 season.  After a disappointing rookie season, he qualified for the 2017 Web.com Tour Finals by finishing 197 on the FedEx Cup point list. He regained his PGA Tour card by winning the 2017 DAP Championship.

Professional wins (10)

Web.com Tour wins (2)

Web.com Tour playoff record (1–1)

PGA Tour Latinoamérica wins (2)

Florida Professional Golf Tour wins (6)

Results in major championships

"T" indicates a tie for a place

See also
2016 Web.com Tour Finals graduates
2017 Web.com Tour Finals graduates
2018 Web.com Tour Finals graduates
2022 Korn Ferry Tour Finals graduates

References

External links
 
 

American male golfers
PGA Tour golfers
PGA Tour Latinoamérica golfers
Korn Ferry Tour graduates
Golfers from California
Golfers from Florida
Sportspeople from Mission Viejo, California
People from Satellite Beach, Florida
1984 births
Living people